Kallithea is a village and a community of the Katerini municipality. Before the 2011 local government reform it was a municipal district and the seat of the municipality of Paralia. The 2011 census recorded 3,134 inhabitants in the village.

References

Populated places in Pieria (regional unit)